Aravet is an abandoned village in the Amasia Municipality of the Shirak Province of Armenia. It was listed as uninhabited in the 2001 census.

Population 
The population of the village since 1886 is as follows:

References 

Former populated places in Shirak Province